907 Rhoda is a large background asteroid from the central region of the asteroid belt, that measures approximately  in diameter. It was discovered on 12 November 1918, by astronomer Max Wolf at the Heidelberg Observatory in southwest Germany. The dark C/X-type asteroid has a long rotation period of 22.4 hours and is likely spherical in shape. It was named after Rhoda Barnard, wife of American astronomer Edward Emerson Barnard (1857–1923).

Orbit and classification 

Rhoda is a non-family asteroid of the main belt's background population when applying the hierarchical clustering method to its proper orbital elements. It orbits the Sun in the central asteroid belt at a distance of 2.3–3.3 AU once every 4 years and 8 months (1,712 days; semi-major axis of 2.8 AU). Its orbit has an eccentricity of 0.16 and an inclination of 20° with respect to the ecliptic.

Naming 

This minor planet was named after Rhoda Barnard (née Calvert), wife of the American astronomer Edward Emerson Barnard (1857–1923), who was himself honored with the asteroid 819 Barnardiana. The official naming was published in the journal Astronomische Nachrichten in 1922 (AN 215, 471). The  was also mentioned in The Names of the Minor Planets by Paul Herget in 1955.

Physical characteristics 

In the Tholen classification, Rhoda is a common, carbonaceous C-type asteroid, while in the Bus–Binzel SMASS classification it is a Xk-subtype, which transitions from the X-type to the uncommon K-type asteroids. In the Barucci-taxonomy, which classified a total of 438 asteroids in 1987, Rhoda is a C0-type.

Rotation period 

In April 2004, a rotational lightcurve of Rhoda was obtained from photometric observations by Brian Warner at the Palmer Divide Observatory  in Colorado. Lightcurve analysis gave a rotation period of  hours with a low brightness variation of  magnitude, indicative of a non-elongated, spherical shape.

Diameter and albedo 

The Collaborative Asteroid Lightcurve Link adopts the results obtained by IRAS, that is, an albedo of 0.0560 and calculates a diameter of 62.73 kilometers based on an absolute magnitude of 10.74. An asteroid occultation, observed on 23 March 2009, gave a best-fit ellipse dimension of 63.0 × 63.0 kilometers. These timed observations are taken when the asteroid passes in front of a distant star.

Notes

References

External links 
 Lightcurve Database Query (LCDB), at www.minorplanet.info
 Dictionary of Minor Planet Names, Google books
 Asteroids and comets rotation curves, CdR – Geneva Observatory, Raoul Behrend
 Discovery Circumstances: Numbered Minor Planets (1)-(5000) – Minor Planet Center
 
 

000907
Discoveries by Max Wolf
Named minor planets
000907
000907
19181112